Peter Louis Antonelli (March 5, 1941 – February 15, 2020) was an American mathematician known for his work on mathematical biology, Finsler geometry, and their connections.

Overview 
Antonelli was born on March 5, 1941, in Syracuse, New York, and became a student at Syracuse University, graduating in 1963. He completed a PhD at Syracuse University, with the 1966 dissertation Structure Theory for Montgomery-Samelson Fiberings Between Manifolds supervised by Erik Hemmingsen.

After a short period as assistant professor at the University of Tennessee, Knoxville from 1967 to 1968, and an NSF post-doctoral fellowship at the Institute for Advanced Study in Princeton, New Jersey, from 1968 to 1970, he took a faculty position at the University of Alberta, Canada, where he stayed for the remainder of his career. In 2006, he moved to Brazil with his wife and colleague S.F. Rutz, where he was a visiting professor at Federal University of Pernambuco, Recife.

He died in 2020.

Contributions to mathematics 
In his early years, Peter L. Antonelli's interests were focused on physics, especially general relativity. As a Ph.D. student, he studied mathematical objects such as special groups of diffeomorphisms and exotic spheres. After 1970, his interests shifted towards applied mathematics, especially applications of differential geometry to developmental biology, ecology, and genetics. As a visiting professor in the biology department at the University of Sussex in the early 1970s,  he pursued interests that had developed from his work in the early 1960s as a United States Public Health Service Fellow in mathematical biology at the University of Chicago.

During the course of his career, Peter L. Antonelli published over 120 research papers in a variety of domains including non-linear mechanics, Hamiltonian systems, diffusion theory, stochastic calculus and stochastic geometry, geometric probability, differential game theory, bifurcation theory, geometry of paths, and  Riemannian, Finslerian and Lagrangian geometries. The geometry of certain non-Riemannian metrics now bear his name. Along with his extensive work on the mathematical ecology of the Great Barrier Reef, he also showed that all living plants and animals are likely derived from two primitive species of bacteria, through the process of endosymbiosis.

Books
Antonelli was the coauthor of books including:

His edited volumes include:

Recognition
In 1987, Antonelli was awarded a McCalla Professorship at the University of Alberta for research excellence. In 2001, he was awarded the degree of Honorary Professor from Alexandru Ioan Cuza University in Romania. Papers from a conference held there in honor of his 60th birthday were later published as a festschrift.

References

Further reading

1941 births
2020 deaths
20th-century American mathematicians
21st-century American mathematicians
Syracuse University alumni
Academic staff of the University of Alberta